Na Hyeon (born 1970) is a South Korean screenwriter and film director.

Career
A veteran screenwriter in the Korean film industry, Na made his directorial debut with the crime thriller The Prison (2017). Highly rated as an action genre film, its distribution rights was sold to 62 countries even before its release in local theatres.

Filmography

As screenwriter
 Mokpo, Gangster's Paradise (2004) 
 Spin Kick (2004)  
May 18 (2007)
Forever the Moment (2008)
Heartbreak Library (2008)
Leafie, A Hen into the Wild (2011) 
My Way (2011)
 South Bound (2013)
 The Prison (2017)

As director
 I Don't Know You (short film, 2012) 
 The Prison (2017)

As script editor
 Spin Kick (2004) - storyboard
 Summer Snow (2015)

As actor
 Spin Kick (2004)
 Forever the Moment (2008)
 Heartbreak Library (2008)
 The Room Nearby (2009)
 Fly, Penguin (2009)
 Re-Encounter (2010)
 Summer Snow (2015)

References

External links
 
 
 

1970 births
Living people
People from Busan
South Korean film directors
South Korean screenwriters
Dong-a University alumni
Chung-Ang University alumni